Riego Meinardo Villa Gamalinda (born May 25, 1986 in Iligan City) is a Filipino professional basketball player who last played for the San Miguel Beermen of the Philippine Basketball Association (PBA). He was drafted 11th overall in 2010 by the Bolts. He was one of the key players of the San Beda Red Lions during its three peat run from 2006 to 2008.

Professional career
In the 2010 PBA draft, he was drafted 11th overall by the Bolts. He played primarily as a backup guard/forward to Mark Cardona and had limited minutes.

At the off-season, he and Shawn Weinstein were traded to the Talk 'N Text Tropang Texters. He was traded along with Rabeh Al-Hussaini and Pamboy Raymundo in a three-way trade involving Air21 Express and Meralco Bolts. He was waived after.

After being waived by TNT, he was picked up by Blackwater Elite in the 2014 PBA Expansion Draft. He had his best year of his career so far, posting career highs in minutes (24 MPG), points (8.2 PPG) and rebounds (4.1 RPG) while playing 33 games during the 2014–15 season. In the following season (2015–16), he had his most efficient year shooting the ball, with career-highs in percentages in both FGs (.433) and 3-point FGs (.319) while playing for 34 games.

On September 10, 2017, Gamalinda, along with Kyle Pascual, was traded to the Star Hotshots for Allein Maliksi and Chris Javier.

On February 7, 2020, Gamalinda signed with the San Miguel Beermen.

PBA career statistics

As of the end of 2021 season

Season-by-season averages

|-
| align=left | 
| align=left | Meralco
| 17 || 10.0 || .340 || .000 || .600 || 1.5 || .7 || .1 || .1 || 2.5
|-
| align=left | 
| align=left | Talk 'N Text
| 41 || 8.4 || .383 || .250 || .550 || .9 || .4 || .0 || .1 || 2.2
|-
| align=left | 
| align=left | Talk 'N Text
| 24 || 5.2 || .382 || .250 || .000 || .5 || .3 || .0 || .1 || 1.2
|-
| align=left | 
| align=left | Blackwater
| 33 || 24.0 || .376 || .293 || .744 || 4.1 || 1.3 || .3 || .2 || 8.2
|-
| align=left | 
| align=left | Blackwater
| 34 || 19.1 || .433 || .319 || .712 || 2.9 || .8 || .4 || .3 || 7.0
|-
| align=left rowspan=2| 
| align=left | Blackwater
| rowspan=2|32 || rowspan=2|14.2 || rowspan=2|.435 || rowspan=2|.393 || rowspan=2|.655 || rowspan=2|2.3 || rowspan=2|.7 || rowspan=2|.3 || rowspan=2|.1 || rowspan=2|3.9
|-
| align=left | Star
|-
| align=left | 
| align=left | Magnolia
| 24 || 7.5 || .459 || .200 || .611 || 1.3 || .3 || .2 || .0 || 2.9
|-
| align=left | 
| align=left | Magnolia
| 11 || 5.0 || .556 || .000 || .000 || .4 || .5 || .1 || .1 || 1.8
|-
| align=left | 
| align=left | San Miguel
| 13 || 13.0 || .409 || .667 || .579 || 3.0 || .4 || .4 || .2 || 3.8
|-
| align=left | 
| align=left | San Miguel
| 16 || 5.8 || .208 || – || .667 || 1.0 || .3 || .1 || .1 || .8
|-class=sortbottom
| align="center" colspan=2 | Career
| 245 || 12.4 || .401 || .295 || .652 || 2.0 || .6 || .2 || .1 || 3.8

References

1986 births
Living people
Basketball players from Lanao del Norte
Blackwater Bossing players
Filipino men's basketball players
Magnolia Hotshots players
Meralco Bolts players
San Beda Red Lions basketball players
People from Iligan
Shooting guards
Small forwards
TNT Tropang Giga players
San Miguel Beermen players
Meralco Bolts draft picks
Filipino men's 3x3 basketball players
PBA 3x3 players